Antonio Miguel Pérez (born January 26, 1980) is a retired Major League Baseball player. In , he led the Los Angeles Dodgers with 11 stolen bases. Pérez signed a minor league contract with the Washington Nationals for the  season, but was released during spring training. In March , he signed a minor league contract with the Atlanta Braves.

While a minor leaguer, Pérez was involved in two major trades. He went from the Cincinnati Reds to the Seattle Mariners in the Ken Griffey Jr. trade in 2000, and was later sent to the Tampa Bay Devil Rays for Randy Winn.  Also, in 2005, he was sent to the Oakland A's for Andre Ethier.

External links

1980 births
Living people
Arizona League Mariners players
Dominican Republic expatriate baseball players in the United States
Durham Bulls players
Gwinnett Braves players
Lancaster JetHawks players
Las Vegas 51s players

Los Angeles Dodgers players
Major League Baseball players from the Dominican Republic
Major League Baseball third basemen
Mississippi Braves players
Oakland Athletics players
Orlando Rays players
Rockford Reds players
Sacramento River Cats players
San Antonio Missions players
Tampa Bay Devil Rays players